Monte Vista Christian School, (also known as MVCS) is a private, co-educational, selective day and boarding Christian school for young men and women in grades 6 through 12, offering a college-preparatory education in the Christian tradition and context. Founded in 1926, MVCS is fully accredited by the Western Association of Schools and Colleges (WASC) and the Association of Christian Schools International (ACSI).

Other

The school colors are blue, black, and white.
The school mascot is the mustang. If you look at the school’s logo carefully, you’ll see that the mustang’s eye is an airplane. This airplane is a Mustang airplane.
The school offers a boarding program for students who wish to live on campus while attending MVCS.
Monte Vista is currently moving towards the IB (International Baccalaureate) program, transitioning away from the AP program. After transitioning, they will be the first Christian school in the United States with a middle and high school with the IB program.

References

External links
Monte Vista Christian School Official Website

Christian schools in California
Private middle schools in California
High schools in Santa Cruz County, California
Watsonville, California
Private high schools in California
1926 establishments in California